The Water Knows No Boundaries was held in 2011 and will be held again in 2018, in Jordan. The topic is solutions to water issues in the Middle East.

References 

Environmental conferences
Water and politics
Events in Jordan